Anissa Helou (born 1 February 1952) is a London-based chef, teacher, and author. She specializes in cooking and writing recipes for Mediterranean, Middle Eastern and North African cuisines. Her cookbooks have won numerous awards. She currently lives in London and runs a cooking school, "Anissa's School."

Biography

The daughter of a Syrian father and a Lebanese mother, Helou left her home in Beirut, Lebanon at the age of 21 to study interior design in London.

Following completion of the Sotheby's Works of Art course, Helou started working for the auction house, becoming their representative for the Middle East. At the age of 24, she opened an Antique shop in Paris. Shortly thereafter, she became a freelance art consultant based in London. Then, between 1978 and 1986, Helou lived in Kuwait acting as an advisor to members of the ruling family, before returning to London in 1986.

Helou was inspired by the Lebanese Civil War and a friend in the publishing industry to write a cookbook. Her first work was titled, Lebanese Cuisine, and it was published in 1994. Robert Irwin described it as "No mere utilitarian manual, but a wistful evocation of feasts and picnics held in an easy-going, Levantine environment which all but came to an end ... in 1975". The book was short-listed for an André Simon Award.

In 1999, Helou changed her life by selling a number of collections at Christie's. She also sold her Victorian house and bought a two-story warehouse loft in Shoreditch, which she then converted into a modern minimalist living and working space. She then opened Anissa's Kitchen in this location.

In 2013, Helou was listed by Arabian Business as one of the 500 most powerful Arabs in the world, and one of the 100 most powerful Arab women.

Her book "Levant" was published in 2013 and was selected as one of Observer Food Monthly's 20 Food Books of the Year, Gourmet Travelers Best Books of 2013, 14 Best Cookbooks of 2013 by BuzzFeed and one of Marie-Claire Digby's Top 10 Food Books of the Year.

Her book Feast: Food of the Islamic World was published in 2018.

Books

 Savory Baking from the Mediterranean] (2007) 
 Modern Mezze] (2007) 
 The Fifth Quarter: An Offal Cookbook (2005) - Most Innovative UK Food Book, 2005 World Gourmand Awards 
 Mediterranean Street Food (2002) - "Best Mediterranean in the English Language", 2002 Gourmand Awards 
 Cafe Morocco (1999) 
 Lebanese Cuisine (1994) - Shortlist, Andrew Simon Book Awards 
 Levant: Recipes and memories from the Middle East (2013) 
 Feast:  Food of the Islamic World (2018)

References

External links
 Official website
 Modern Mediterranean Kitchen: Anissa Helou, Food & Wine Magazine, March 1, 2004
 Comfort Food of the Chefs: Anissa Helou, Cooking Light, February 17, 2012 
 Breaking the Fast, by Anissa Helou, Saveur, August 4, 2011
 Anissa Helou's Last Supper, The Guardian, May 3, 2014

Living people
English food writers
English people of Lebanese descent
1952 births
Lebanese people of Syrian descent
Lebanese emigrants to the United Kingdom
20th-century English non-fiction writers
21st-century English writers
Women cookbook writers
British food writers
20th-century English women writers
21st-century English women writers
21st-century British non-fiction writers
English women non-fiction writers